Glasgow (pop. 776) is a region in the Nickerie District of northern Suriname, about  from the district capital, Nieuw Nickerie.

References

Populated places in Nickerie District